Mohd Hafiz bin Kamal (born 9 July 1987) is a Malaysian footballer who plays as a midfielder for Respect FC. He was born in Pantai Remis, Perak. He is a set-piece specialist and regularly takes charge of corner and free kick duties for his team.  He has commanded a regular role with Pahang, and helped them lift the Malaysia Cup in 2013. His last penalty kick helped the club retaining the Malaysia Cup, a year later.

International career 
Hafiz has been called up for the national team by interim national coach, Datuk Ong Kim Swee among 25 players for centralised training ahead of Malaysia’s final Asian Cup qualifier Group D match against Yemen at the Sheikh Tahnoon Stadium in Al-Ain in the United Arab Emirates on 5 March 2014.

On 1 March 2014, Hafiz made his debut for Malaysia team in the friendly match against Philippines. He started the game alongside Safiq Rahim before have been replaced by Badhri Radzi.

International statistics

Honours

Club
Pahang FA
Malaysia Cup (2): 2013, 2014
FA Cup (1): 2014
Malaysian Charity Shield (1): 2014
Piala Emas Raja-Raja (1): 2011

International
2014 AFF Suzuki Cup: Runner Up

References

External links
 Hafiz tekad bawa Pahang ke final
 Hafiz Kamal apologises to Pahang fans for his behaviour
 Liga Super: Pahang kekal kerusi pendahulu
 Lapan pemain Pahang rebut empat kekosongan
 Ujian terbaik
 Tok Gajah tagih khidmat lima tonggak
 Hafiz tak duga cipta jaringan
 Pahang julang Piala Emas Raja-raja

1987 births
Living people
Malaysian footballers
Malaysia international footballers
Sri Pahang FC players
Shahzan Muda FC players
Selangor FA players
Perak F.C. players
People from Perak
Malaysia Super League players
Association football midfielders
Malaysian people of Malay descent